The Morinville Jets are a Canadian Junior B ice hockey team located in Morinville, Alberta. They play in the Capital Junior Hockey League. Their head coach is Trent Brown.

Recent history

The Morinville Jets were founded in 1977, and have enjoyed moderate success throughout their 38 years in the CJHL, but have never won the league title. The Jets hosted the 2012 CJHL All-Star Game in 2012.
In September 2012, recent team grad and former captain Nick McRae was killed in an ATV accident near Edson. In honour of him, the team retired McRae's former number, 11. The Jets' closest geographical rival is the St. Albert Merchants, with whom they hold a fierce rivalry.

Season-by-season record

Records as of April 17, 2015.

Staff

Morinville Jets staff:

Head Coach - Trent Brown
Assistant Coaches - Jeff Montina, Darwin Bozek, Cam Melville
Trainer - Alyson Hodgson
Equipment Manager - Lyle Burant
Manager - Jerry Hills
President - Brent Melville

See also

List of ice hockey teams in Alberta

References

External links

Jets homepage

Ice hockey teams in Alberta
1977 establishments in Alberta